St Michael's Church is the Church of England parish church of Monkton Combe, Somerset, England. It was also the parish church of Combe Down until the 1850s when the communities separated. It is a Grade II listed building.

Background

The structure is mostly mid-Victorian. Predominantly an example of Early English Gothic Revival, the structure has a steep pitched polychrome Welsh Slate roof and other aspects that clearly mark it from a distance as being a mid 19th Century construction. The main tower is surmounted by a gilded weather cock.

Norman Church
The village was owned by the Bath Abbey monks, hence the name Monkton Combe, and the first structure was considered to be an “ancient Norman” one. The parish minutes of 1757 give a glimpse of the small church structure having a chancel with at least two pews.  “The church is a small structure, 50 feet in length and 16 feet in breadth, covered with tiles; at the west end in a little stone turret hangs two small bells. It is dedicated to St. Michael.”

Regency Church
“About the beginning of the 19th century, when this little old church, after long neglect, needed extensive repairs, the inhabitant instead of repairing it, pulled it down and out of its materials build a new church of about the same size, seating only 95 persons, but to their minds no doubt more comfortable. It was erected in 1814 and did not last long. The Rev. Francis Pocock, being appointed vicar of Monkton Combe in 1863, found this church in a dilapidated state, and … for the needs for the parish, and had the courage to undertake the entire rebuilding of the sacred edifice.” Revd Pocock went on to found Monkton Combe School in 1868.

Bells

The tower contains an 8-bell chime
which was installed as a memorial to Rev. Francis Pocock, vicar of the parish from 1863 to 1875.
It was cast by J. Taylor of Loughborough and dedicated at Easter 1927 by the Lord Bishop of Bath and Wells.
There are also two small ancient bells which are survivors from a previous building on this site.

Organ
The church contains a two manual pipe organ by Henry Jones and Sons.

Churchyard
The churchyard contains the grave of Harry Patch, known as the "Last Fighting Tommy" and the last surviving British Army soldier to have fought in World War I. He died aged 111 and was buried there in July 2009, near the graves of several members of his family.

List of Incumbents

See also
 List of ecclesiastical parishes in the Diocese of Bath and Wells

External links
 Photos of St. Michael's

References

Rev. John Collinson, History of Somerset, 1791.
Rev. D. Lee Pitcairn and Rev. Alfred Richardson, An Historical Guide to Monkton Combe, Combe Down and Claverton (Bath: F. Goodall Printer, 1924) 28–29.
Bath Chronicle, July 6, 1865.
Nikolaus Pevsner, The Buildings of England: North Somerset and Bristol, (Harmondsworth, Middlesex: Penguin Books, 1958), 229.

Monkton Combe
Churches completed in 1865
19th-century Church of England church buildings
Gothic Revival church buildings in England
Gothic Revival architecture in Somerset
Monkton Combe